Wan Mohd Hoesne bin Wan Hussain (born 2 September 1987) is a Malaysian footballer who plays as a striker for Selangor FA.

Career
In December 2008, he joins Johor FC for season 2009 from Selangor FA President's Cup Team. Then, the club release him and in December 2011, he sign a contract with Selangor FA for 2012 Malaysia Super League season.

External links
 Profile Wan Mohd Hoesne

References
 Page Wan Mohd Hoesne Wan Hussain
 biodata Wan Mohd Hoesne Wan Hussain

1987 births
Living people
Malaysian footballers
Malaysia Super League players
Selangor FA players
People from Selangor
Association football forwards